is a passenger railway station located in Higashinada-ku, Kobe, Hyōgo Prefecture, Japan. It is operated by the private transportation company Hankyu Railway.

Lines

Layout
The station consists of two opposed side platforms, connected by an underground passage.

Platforms

History 
Okamoto Station opened on 16 July 1920.

The level crossing on the station premises were removed in 1967 while the station building was reconstructed in 1979.

The station was damaged by the Great Hanshin earthquake in January 1995. Restoration work on the Kobe Line took 7 months to complete.

Station numbering was introduced on 21 December 2013, with Okamoto being designated as station number HK-11.

Passenger statistics
In fiscal 2019, the station was used by an average of 28,105 passengers daily

Surrounding area 
Settsu-Motoyama Station (JR Kōbe Line)
Konan University（甲南大学）
Konan Women's University（甲南女子大学）
Konan Girls' Junior and Senior High School（甲南女子中学校・高等学校）
Kobe Pharmaceutical University（神戸薬科大学）
Yamate Road（山手幹線）
Okamoto Bairin Park（岡本梅林公園）
In the area around Okamoto Station, there are two famous 'Bairin', spots to see plum flowers in early spring. Those are Okamoto Bairin and Hokura Bairin.

Buses
Kobe City Bus
Route 31 for JR Konan-Yamate / for Uzumoridai
Route 33 for JR Konan-Yamate / for 
Route 34 for JR Konan-Yamate / for Uozaki-Hamamachi
Kobe Minato Kanko
Route 11 directly to Rokko Island
Route 12 for Hanshin Mikage and Rokko Island / for Shukugawa Green Town (Hankyu Shukugawa Station)

See also
List of railway stations in Japan

References

External links

 Okamoto Station website 

Railway stations in Japan opened in 1920
Railway stations in Kobe
Hankyū Kōbe Main Line